The 2016 United Nations Security Council election was held on 28 June during the 70th session of the United Nations General Assembly, held at United Nations Headquarters in New York City. The elections were for five non-permanent seats on the UN Security Council for two-year mandates commencing on 1 January 2017.
In accordance with the Security Council's rotation rules, whereby the ten non-permanent UNSC seats rotate among the various regional blocs into which UN member states traditionally divide themselves for voting and representation purposes, the five available seats were allocated as follows:

One for Africa 
One for the Asia-Pacific Group
One for Latin America and the Caribbean
Two for the Western European and Others Group

The five members will serve on the Security Council for the 2017–18 period.

This was the first time a Security Council election was held in the month of June. On 18 September 2014, the General Assembly adopted Resolution 68/307 to push the elections back to six months prior to the beginning of the newly elected Council members' terms. Moreover, this was the first election of Kazakhstan to the Council.

Candidates

African Group 

 — Withdrew in January 2016 at the African Union summit in favour of Ethiopia.
 — Withdrew on 16 January 2016 in favour of Ethiopia.

Asia-Pacific Group

Latin American and Caribbean Group

Western European and Others Group

Support
William Courtney, the former U.S. Ambassador to Kazakhstan, said that "based on the solid successes of Kazakhstan to establish CICA, Chairmanship of the OSCE and the Organization of Islamic Cooperation, Kazakhstan, like no other country, deserves special trust and is a suitable candidate for a non-permanent member of the UN Security Council."

Public debate 

In May 2016, the World Federation of United Nations Associations hosted the first open debates for UN Member States competing for a seat as a non-permanent member to the Security Council. All five contenders participated in the debate.

Result

African and Asia-Pacific Groups

Kazakhstan became the first Central Asian country to sit on the UNSC.

Latin American and Caribbean Group

Western European and Other Group

Day 1

Following five rounds of inconclusive voting, Bert Koenders and Paolo Gentiloni, Foreign Ministers of the Netherlands and Italy respectively, announced a proposal whereby the Netherlands and Italy would split the two-year term with each country serving one year. Such arrangements were relatively common in deadlocked elections starting in the late 1950s until 1966, when the Security Council was enlarged. This however would be the first time in over five decades that two members agreed to split a term; intractable deadlocks have instead usually been resolved by the candidate countries withdrawing in favor of a third member state.

Day 2

See also
List of members of the United Nations Security Council
European Union and the United Nations

References

External links
Kazakhstan UNSC Campaign website

2016 elections
2016
Non-partisan elections
June 2016 events